Hen and Chickens is a shallow coral reef located within the Florida Keys National Marine Sanctuary. For a while in the 20th century it was marked by the Hen and Chickens Shoal Light. It lies to the southeast of Plantation Key.  This reef lies within a Sanctuary Preservation Area (SPA).

Gallery

External links
 Benthic Habitat Map

References
 NOAA National Marine Sanctuary Maps, Florida Keys East
 NOAA website on Hen and Chickens

Coral reefs of the Florida Keys